Pescadito is a type of food in Mexico, with similar counterparts in other parts of the world, consisting of a strip of breaded fish meat. The preparation for the batter consists of wheat flour, salt, egg, corn starch and water. The strip is immersed in it and is introduced in hot oil. It is served with lemon and hot sauce.

See also
Pescaíto frito, Spain
Fish and chips, UK

References

External links
Video
Video

Mexican cuisine
Fish dishes